Virginia Fiester Frederick (née Heise) (December 24, 1916 – May 30, 2010) was an American politician.

Born in Rock Island, Illinois. Frederick received her bachelor's degree from University of Iowa. She lived in Lake Forest, Illinois. Frederick served in the Illinois House of Representatives from 1979 to 1995 and was a Republican.

Notes

|-

1916 births
2010 deaths
People from Oak Forest, Illinois
Politicians from Rock Island, Illinois
University of Iowa alumni
Women state legislators in Illinois
Republican Party members of the Illinois House of Representatives
21st-century American women